Niedzieliska may refer to the following places:
 Niedzieliska, Lesser Poland Voivodeship (south Poland)
 Niedzieliska, Łódź Voivodeship (central Poland)
 Niedzieliska, Lublin Voivodeship (east Poland)
 Niedzieliska-Kolonia